Andrey Zaleski (born 20 January 1991) is a Belarusian professional football player currently playing for Slavia Mozyr.

His younger brother Aleksey Zaleski is also a professional footballer.

Honours
Dinamo Brest
Belarusian Cup winner: 2017–18
Belarusian Super Cup winner: 2018

References

External links

1991 births
Living people
Belarusian footballers
Belarusian expatriate footballers
Association football defenders
FC Dinamo Minsk players
FC Bereza-2010 players
FC Slutsk players
FC Dynamo Brest players
FC Zhetysu players
FC Turan players
FC Slavia Mozyr players
Belarusian Premier League players
Belarusian First League players
Kazakhstan Premier League players
Belarusian expatriate sportspeople in Kazakhstan
Expatriate footballers in Kazakhstan